Oleksandrivske is an urban-type settlement in the Horlivka Raion, Donetsk Oblast (province) of eastern Ukraine. Population:

Demographics
Native language as of the Ukrainian Census of 2001:
 Ukrainian 12.28%
 Russian 86.82%
 Belarusian 0.50%
 Moldovan (Romanian) 0.10%

References

Urban-type settlements in Horlivka Raion